Bay View may refer to:

Places
New Zealand:
 Bay View, New Zealand (in Hawke's Bay)

South Africa:
 Bay View, Western Cape

United Kingdom:
 Bay View, Kent

United States:
 Bay View, California, former name of Bayview, Humboldt County, California
 Bay View, Michigan
 Bay View, Ohio
 Bay View, Washington
 Bay View, Wisconsin (disambiguation), multiple places
 Bay View, a neighborhood of Gloucester, Massachusetts
Bay View station, Los Angeles, California

Other uses
 San Francisco Bay View, newspaper, after the San Francisco neighborhood

See also
Bayview (disambiguation)
Bayview Hill (disambiguation)